Have Your Loved Ones Spayed or Neutered is an album by American comedian Jeff Foxworthy. It was released by Warner Bros. Records on July 6, 2004. The album peaked at number 47 on the Billboard 200 chart.

Track listing
All tracks written by Jay Foxworthy, Jeff Foxworthy, Mike Shydner and Mike Venneman; additional writing on "I Believe (Encore)" by Larry the Cable Guy.
"Have Your Loved Ones Spayed or Neutered" – 8:37
"Airport Security and Rental Cars" – 3:14
"TV and Its Side Effects" – 9:49
"Oreo Generation" – 3:42
"I'm Next in Line" – 8:26
"Grocery Stores" – 2:36
"Courtesy Sniffs" – 4:14
"I Believe (Encore)" – 13:35
includes a parody of "Can't You See" by the Marshall Tucker Band, written by Toy Caldwell

Charts

Weekly charts

Year-end charts

References

2004 live albums
Jeff Foxworthy albums
Warner Records live albums
2000s comedy albums
Live comedy albums
Spoken word albums by American artists